The Cape Disappointment Light is a lighthouse on Cape Disappointment near the mouth of the Columbia River in the U.S. state of Washington.

History 
In 1848, a lighthouse was recommended to be located at Cape Disappointment in what was then the Oregon Territory. An appropriation of $53,000 was made in 1852. After the lighthouse was designed, a first-order Fresnel lens was ordered. When the lens arrived it was found to be too large for the tower. Rebuilding the tower took an additional two years. The first lighthouse in the Pacific Northwest was finally lit on October 15, 1856. In addition to the light, the station was equipped with a  bell powered by a striking mechanism. The keeper's residence was about a quarter-mile away.

The lighthouse had several shortcomings. The fog bell was sometimes inaudible due to the roar of ocean waves. It was discontinued in 1881 and moved to West Point Light in Seattle, and eventually to Warrior Rock Light near Portland. Also, the light was not visible to ships approaching from the north. This problem was corrected by building a lighthouse at North Head, two miles from Cape Disappointment. The first-order lens was moved to North Head and a fourth-order lens installed at Cape Disappointment.

The lighthouse was electrified in 1937. In 1956, the Coast Guard intended to close the station, but retained the light when the Columbia River bar pilots protested. The light was automated in 1973. An observation deck has been built for the Coast Guard to monitor traffic and bar conditions. The grounds are open to the public through Cape Disappointment State Park.

See also
List of Washington lighthouses
List of Oregon lighthouses

References

Further reading

External links 
 

Lighthouses completed in 1856
Lighthouses in Washington (state)
Transportation buildings and structures in Pacific County, Washington